Gyurme Dorje (1950 – 5 February 2020) was a Scottish Tibetologist and writer.

Early life 
In Edinburgh he studied classics at George Watson's College and developed an early interest in Buddhist philosophy. He held a PhD in Tibetan Literature (SOAS) and an MA in Sanskrit with Oriental Studies (Edinburgh).

Career 
In the 1970s he spent a decade living in Tibetan communities in India and Nepal where he received extensive teachings from Kangyur Rinpoche, Dudjom Rinpoche, Chatral Rinpoche, and Dilgo Khyentse Rinpoche. In 1971 Dudjom Rinpoche encouraged him to begin translating his recently completed History of the Nyingma School and in 1980 his Fundamentals of the Nyingma School - together this was an undertaking that was to take twenty years, only reaching completion in 1991. 

In the 1980s Gyurme returned to the UK and in 1987 completed his 3 volume doctoral dissertation on the Guhyagarbhatantra  and Longchenpa's commentary on this text at the School of Oriental and African Studies (SOAS) at the University of London. From 1991 to 1996 Gyurme held research fellowships at London University, where he worked with Alak Zenkar Rinpoche on translating (with corrections) the content of the Great Sanskrit Tibetan Chinese Dictionary to create the three volume Encyclopaedic Tibetan-English Dictionary.  He wrote, edited, translated and contributed to numerous important books on Tibetan religion and culture including The Nyingma School of Tibetan Buddhism: Its Fundamentals and History (2 vol.) (Wisdom, 1991), Tibetan Medical Paintings 2 vol. (Serindia, 1992), The Tibet Handbook (Footprint, 1996), the first complete translation of the Tibetan Book of the Dead, and A Handbook of Tibetan Culture (Shambhala, 1994).

Personal life

Gyurme Dorje was married to Xiaohong Dorje and lived in Crieff, Scotland. He had two daughters, Pema and Tinley, as well as a son, Orgyen.

He died in February 2020.

Published works

 
 
 
  (3 vols)
 Gyurme Dorje (1991) Dudjom Rinpoche's The Nyingma School of Tibetan Buddhism: Its Fundamentals and History. Boston, Wisdom Publications. 1st edition (2 vols), 1991; 2nd edition (1 vol), 2002; . 
 Tibetan Medical Paintings. Serindia Publications, London (2 Vols); . 1992. 
 Tibet Handbook. Footprint Handbooks, Bath. 1st edition, 1996; 2nd edition 1999; 3rd edition 2004;  See Footprintbooks
 Bhutan Handbook. Footprint Handbooks, Bath. 1st edition, 2004. 
 Tibetan Elemental Divination Paintings Eskenazi & Fogg, London. 2001. See Whiteberyl
 An Encyclopaedic Tibetan-English Dictionary (Nationalities Publishing House/ SOAS, Beijing. Vol. 1 (2001), Vols 2 & ). 
 "A Rare Series of Tibetan Banners", in Pearls of the Orient, Serindia, 2003. 

 The Great Temple of Lhasa, Thames & Hudson, 2005
 A Buddhist response to the climate emergency, 2009, (co-edited with John Stanley and David R. Loy)
 The Guhyagarbha Tantra: Dispelling the Darkness of the Ten Directions (Snowlion)

References

External links
 Tsadra Foundation English Translation Grantees:Gyurme Dorje 
 Gyurme Dorje - Wisdom publications

Tibetan–English translators

1950 births
2020 deaths
Religion academics
Tibetan Buddhists
Tibetologists
Scottish Buddhists
Scottish orientalists
Scottish translators
Scottish travel writers
Scottish religious writers
Scottish lexicographers
People educated at George Watson's College
Alumni of the University of Edinburgh
Alumni of SOAS University of London